The Spencer Street Bridge is a road and tram bridge over the Yarra River in Melbourne, Australia. It connects Spencer Street on the north bank with Clarendon Street on the south. The idea of a bridge at this point was first put forward in the mid-1800s.

The design of the bridge was a public competition won by Messrs. Edward Saunders and Alan Wilson, engineers, in conjunction with Messrs. Alfred R. La Gerche and W. E. Gower, architects., the competition result being announced in November 1925 The first pile was driven in October 1927.

During construction engineers knew deep foundations would be required to find bedrock, but at 20 metres below sea level they struck a red gum stump that took three weeks work to remove. It was dated at about 8,000 years old and appears to have lived for well over 400 years. The cantilever girder type, with steel girder suspended span bridge was completed in 1930, with an adjacent glass and steel covered footbridge built alongside in 1998, as part of the Melbourne Convention and Exhibition Centre.

Gallery

References

External links
Spencer Street Bridge, Victorian Heritage Database
SPENCER STREET BRIDGE CONSTRUCTION, 0.75 CUBIC YARD GRAB IN ACTION IN DEEP CYLINDERS MAY 1928, Photograph, PROVWiki
Arup: Spencer Street Footbridge, Melbourne, Australia

Bridges in Melbourne
Bridges over the Yarra River
1930 establishments in Australia
Landmarks in Melbourne
Buildings and structures in the City of Melbourne (LGA)
Transport in the City of Melbourne (LGA)
Bridges completed in 1930
Southbank, Victoria